Dinesh Thakur (1947 – 20 September 2012) was an Indian theatre director, actor in theatre, television and Hindi film, where most notably he appeared as one of the leads in Rajnigandha 1974 and directed by Basu Chatterjee, which won both Filmfare Best Movie Award and the Filmfare Critics Award for Best Movie. Dinesh Thakur was born in 1947 in Jaipur, Rajasthan, India.  He was the founder-director of ANK productions, a Mumbai-based theatre company, established in 1976.

Though he mainly appeared as character roles in Hindi films, as a screenwriter and story writer, he is known for writing the story and screenplay of Ghar (1978), which won him the 1979 Filmfare Best Story Award.

He died on 20 September 2012 due to kidney failure.

Career

Dinesh Thakur did his graduation from Kirori Mal College (KMC), Delhi University, where was also part of the KMC dramatic society.

He made his film debut in 1971, with Mere Apne, written and directed by Gulzar, and followed it up with Basu Bhattacharya's Anubhav (1971) and later in Griha Pravesh (1979). 1974 saw him appearing in Basu Chatterjee's landmark in middle cinema, Rajnigandha (1974), alongside Amol Palekar and Vidya Sinha, which won the Filmfare Best Film Award, and went on appear in several films with both the directors in the coming years.

He established 'Ank Theatre Group' in 1976, dedicated solely to Hindi theatre in Mumbai; though it started flourishing in a big way with the advent on Jennifer Kapoor's Prithvi Theatre in 1978.

Filmography
 Mere Apne (1971)
 Anubhav (1971)
 Jalte Badan (1973)
 Rajnigandha (10 Sep 1974) as Naveen Ad Filmmaker
 Parinay (1974)
 Faslah (1974)
 Kalicharan (1976)
 Karm (1977)
 Madhu Malti (1978)
 Ghar (1978)
 Naiyya (1979)
 Meera (1979) as Jaimal Rathod
 Griha Pravesh (1979)
 Khwab (1980)
 The Burning Train (1980) as Ticket Checker (TC)
 La nouvelle malle des Indes (1981) TV mini-series
 Sitara (1980)
 Agni Pareeksha (1981)
 Baghavat (1982)
 Aamne Samne (1982)
 Manju (1983)
 Kanoon Kya Karenga (1983)
 Aaj Ki Awaz (1984)
 Sanjhi (1985)
 Ulta Seedha (1985)
 Surkhiyaan 1985)
 Palay Khan (1986)
 Raj Dulari (1988)
 Aakhri Baazi (1989)
 Panchvati (1990)
 Hum Se Na Takrana (1990)
 Zakhmi Rooh (1993)
 Geetanjali (1993)
 Shanti (1994) TV series
 Aastha(1997)
 Aakhri Sanghursh (1997)
 Fiza (2000)
 Nyaay TV series (2000-2001)
 Kyunki Saas Bhi Kabhi Bahu Thi TV series (2000)
 Dil Pardesi Ho Gaya (2003)
 Nigehbaan: The Third Eye (2005)

Plays
 Hai Mera Dil, adaption of Broadway play by Norman Barasch and Carroll Moore, also made into 1964 American comedy film, Send Me No Flowers with starring Rock Hudson, Doris Day and Tony Randall.
 Jin Lahore Nai Dekhya, Asghar Wajahat
 Tughlaq, Girish Karnad, (translated into Hindustani by B.V. Karanth
 Baki Itihas and Pagla Ghora, by Badal Sircar
 Suno Janmejaya by Shri Ranga
 Jaat Hi Poochho Sadhu Ki, Vijay Tendulkar
 Khamosh! Adalat Jaari Hai, Vijay Tendulkar
  Kamala, Vijay Tendulkar
 Adhe Adhure, Mohan Rakesh
 Rakt-Beej, Shankar Shesh
 Mahabhoj, Manu Bhandari
 Atamkatha, Mahesh Elkunchwar
 Gaganbhedi, Vasant Kanetkar
 Hangamakhez, Agha Hashar Kashmiri
 Sheh Ye Maat, B.M. Shah

References

External links
 
 Ank Theatre Group, Website
 Dinesh Thakur Filmography Bollywood Hungama

Indian male stage actors
Indian male film actors
Male actors in Hindi cinema
Indian theatre directors
Filmfare Awards winners
Deaths from kidney failure
2012 deaths
Kirori Mal College alumni
Hindi theatre
1947 births
Recipients of the Sangeet Natak Akademi Award